Ray Davies was a Welsh trumpeter, session musician, and bandleader, active from the 1940s to 1970s. Much of his work featured on the Boosey & Hawkes stock music library, experiencing a surge in popularity during the 1990s lounge revival, and he also frequently conducted the BBC Radio Orchestra, as well as playing for the BBC Big Band. He is the father of record producer Rhett Davies, and served as chairman of BASCA from 2004 to 2010.

During his childhood, he played in local military bands, after which he attended the Royal College of Music. After finishing his education, he began to play trumpet for a large number of orchestras, big bands, and theatres across London, including that of Frank Cordell.

In the 1960s, he took part in a session for Reader's Digest, which, wanting a British response to Herb Alpert, led to Davies forming his band. This group was known as Ray Davies and The Button-Down Brass (or The Button-Down Brass Featuring The Funky Trumpet of Ray Davies), and it released a series of popular easy-listening albums, as well as covers of television and film theme tunes.

At the same time, he also entered the pop scene, playing trumpet on records such as It's Not Unusual, Downtown, and Shirley Bassey's version of Big Spender. Known for his short temper, he became an accomplished songwriter, and he was consulted by many pop bands, including The Beatles and The Rolling Stones, on musical arrangements.

References 

1927 births
2017 deaths
Alumni of the Royal College of Music